Risalewala railway station is located in Risalewala village, Faisalabad district of Punjab province of Pakistan. This railway station serves as the railway station for Faisalabad International Airport, as the airport is located in the Risalewala village area.

See also
 List of railway stations in Pakistan
 Pakistan Railways

References

External links

Railway stations in Faisalabad District
Railway stations on Khanewal–Wazirabad Line